Hilliard is a town in Nassau County, Florida, United States; north-west of Jacksonville. As of the 2020 census, the population was 2,967. In 2003, Hilliard was chosen as the "2003 Rural Community of the Year" by Florida governor Jeb Bush, because of its collaboration with the YMCA to establish a local chapter, which includes a large swimming pool and exercise facilities.

Geography

Hilliard is located at  (30.687760, –81.925022). Hilliard is near the Florida-Georgia border, and within the Jacksonville metropolitan area.

Demographics

As of the census of 2000, there were 2,702 people, 966 households, and 705 families residing in the town. The racial makeup of the town was 84.09% White, 13.10% African American, 0.70% Native American, 0.48% Asian, and 1.63% from two or more races. Hispanic or Latino of any race were 1.00% of the population.

There were 966 households, out of which 40.7% had children under the age of 18 living with them, 49.8% were married couples living together, 18.5% had a female householder with no husband present, and 27.0% were non-families. 24.5% of all households were made up of individuals, and 9.9% had someone living alone who was 65 years of age or older.  The average household size was 2.68 and the average family size was 3.17.

In the town, the population was spread out, with 30.4% under the age of 18, 8.8% from 18 to 24, 27.9% from 25 to 44, 20.4% from 45 to 64, and 12.5% who were 65 years of age or older.  The median age was 33 years. For every 100 females, there were 87.0 males.  For every 100 females age 18 and over, there were 82.6 males.

The median income for a household in the town was $34,531, and the median income for a family was $37,227. Males had a median income of $34,554 versus $23,713 for females. The per capita income for the town was $14,683.  About 11.0% of families and 11.7% of the population were below the poverty line, including 10.2% of those under age 18 and 18.6% of those age 65 or over.

Economy

Along with Callahan, Hilliard is one of the major economic centers of western Nassau County.  Its location on the railroad and at the intersection of several major roads (US 1 and County Road 108) have contributed significantly to economic growth.  The area has significant stands of lumber used in the manufacture of paper as well as wood products.  Much of the area land for tree farming is owned by either Rayonier or The Moyer Company.

Hilliard is home to a Federal Aviation Administration (FAA) Air Traffic Control Center, which coordinates most commercial and civilian air traffic for the southeastern United States.  The FAA center is a major employer in Hilliard and there are many retired FAA employees who live in the area and enjoy the relaxed rural lifestyle.

Hilliard is one of many towns along US 1 that saw its tourism trade dwindle when I-95 was opened. Logging is a major industry in the area surrounding Hilliard.

Because of specific soil conditions and a great deal of open rural land in the area, Hilliard was at one time considered by the Department of Energy as a possible site for the Superconducting Super Collider; however, that never materialized.

Education

There are 680 residents, or 25.1% of the total population, who are enrolled in some type of school.  7.9% of those school-age individuals are in nursery or pre-school, 9.0% attend kindergarten, 44.6 are in elementary school (grades 1–8), 30.4% are in high school (9–12), and 8.1% are enrolled in college or graduate school.

Hilliard has 1,651 residents who are 25 years and older.  8.8% have less than a 9th grade education, and 23.9% have between a 9th and 12th grade education, but no diploma.  38.3% have a high school diploma or GED, 18.8% have some college but no degree, 4.3% have an Associate's degree, 3.8% have a Bachelor's degree, and 2.0% have a Master's degree or higher.

Educational institutions

It is a part of the Nassau County School District. Hilliard Elementary School serves grades K–5, and Hilliard Middle-Senior High School is a consolidated institution which holds grades 6–12.

Nassau County Public Library operates the Hilliard Branch Library.

Transportation

Area roads
Hilliard lies at the intersection of County Road 108 and US 1, which is also part of US 301 and US 23 as it runs south from the St. Mary's River to Callahan. CR 108 is known as Second Street while passing through Hilliard; at this intersection is the only complete set of traffic signals in the town. There is also a blinking yellow light approximately two miles south, at the intersection of Old Dixie Highway and US 1.

Railroads 
The sole railroad line within Hilliard is the CSX Nahunta Subdivision, a former Atlantic Coast Line Railroad line which runs from the Jacksonville Terminal Subdivision in Jacksonville to the Savannah Subdivision in Savannah, Georgia.

Air transport
The Hilliard Airpark is a small, unpaved airstrip available for personal aircraft. This is a municipal facility, and has hangars available for those who want them.  The Airpark can also be used as a landing site for helicopters to transport patients in urgent situations. The complex is located on Eastwood Road, across the street from Eastwood Oaks Apartments.

Government

Mayor: Floyd Vanzant

Town Clerk: Lisa Purvis

Council Members
 John P. Beasley (Council President / Parks & Recreation Commissioner)
 Kenny Sims (Council Pro Tem & Street Commissioner)
 Lee Pickett (Water & Sewer Commissioner)
 Jared Wollitz (Fire Commissioner)
 Callie Bishop (Airpark Commissioner)

Nassau County Fire Rescue operates Station 40 in Hilliard, as well as Station 90 River Road.

Notable people

 Mike Alessi, Professional Motocross/Supercross
 Howie Kendrick, Major League Baseball player for the Anaheim Angels
 Daniel Thomas, National Football League player for the Miami Dolphins

References

External links

Hilliard Middle-Senior High School
Hilliard Elementary School

Towns in Nassau County, Florida
Towns in the Jacksonville metropolitan area
Towns in Florida